Erruca consors is a moth of the family Erebidae. It was described by Francis Walker in 1854. It is found in Brazil.

References

Arctiinae
Moths described in 1854